Sandytown is an unincorporated community in Clinton Township, Vermillion County, in the U.S. state of Indiana.

History
Sandytown began as a mining community. The community received its name on account of the sandy character of its soil.

Geography

References

Unincorporated communities in Vermillion County, Indiana
Unincorporated communities in Indiana